During the 1996–97 English football season, Bradford City A.F.C. competed in the Football League First Division.

Season summary
Kamara used 42 players in 1996–97 when Bradford avoided relegation with a 3–0 victory in the final game against Queens Park Rangers.

Final league table

Results
Bradford City's score comes first

Legend

Football League First Division

FA Cup

League Cup

First-team squad

Left club during season

References

Bradford City A.F.C. seasons
Bradford City